Santa Lucia is a Baroque-style Roman Catholic church located on Strada Cavour in central Parma, region of Emilia Romagna, Italy.

History

A church on the site called San Michele in Canale is first mentioned in documents from 1223. The present building was erected by the Confraternity of San Carlo Borromeo in 1615. The structure was enlarged and facade designed by the architect Mauro Oddi and in 1697, reconsecrated and named Santa Lucia. 

The facade sculptures of Saints Ilario and Agatha and the façade medallion were completed by Giacomo Barbieri. 

The main altar has a canvas depicting the Last Communion and Martyrdom of St Lucy by the Venetian painter Sebastiano Ricci.  The ceiling quadratura frescoes were painted by Alessandro Baratta (painter). The church also has paintings by Giulio Cesare Amidano and Antonio Ligori. The cupola frescoes were painted by the Theatine priest Filippo Maria Galletti.

References

Roman Catholic churches in Parma
Baroque architecture in Parma
17th-century Roman Catholic church buildings in Italy
Roman Catholic churches completed in 1697
1223 establishments in Europe
13th-century establishments in Italy
1615 establishments in Italy